
Gmina Wiśniew is a rural gmina (administrative district) in Siedlce County, Masovian Voivodeship, in east-central Poland.

Villages
Gmina Wiśniew contains the villages and settlements of Borki-Kosiorki, Borki-Paduchy, Borki-Sołdy, Ciosny, Daćbogi, Gostchorz, Helenów, Kaczory, Lipniak, Łupiny, Mościbrody, Mościbrody-Kolonia, Mroczki, Myrcha, Nowe Okniny, Okniny-Podzdrój, Pluty, Radomyśl, Śmiary, Stare Okniny, Stok Wiśniewski, Tworki, Wiśniew, Wiśniew-Kolonia, Wólka Wiśniewska, Wólka Wołyniecka and Zabłocie.

Neighbouring gminas
Gmina Wiśniew is bordered by the gminas of Domanice, Łuków, Siedlce, Skórzec and Zbuczyn.

References

Polish official population figures 2006

Wisniew
Siedlce County